Longchaeus turritus is a species of sea snail, a marine gastropod mollusk in the family Pyramidellidae, the pyrams and their allies.

Distribution
This marine species occurs in the following locations:
 Madagascar
 Tanzania

References

 Odé, H. (1998). Indo-Pacific taxa of turbonilids, excluding those along the Americas. Texas Conchologist. 34 (2): 33-103
 Robba E. (2013) Tertiary and Quaternary fossil pyramidelloidean gastropods of Indonesia. Scripta Geologica 144: 1-191

External links
 To Encyclopedia of Life
 To World Register of Marine Species

Pyramidellidae
Gastropods described in 1854